Lars Gunnar Victor Gullin (4 May 1928 – 17 May 1976) was a Swedish jazz saxophonist.

Career
Lars Gullin was born in Visby, Sweden. He was a child prodigy on the accordion. At age thirteen, he played clarinet in a military band and later learned the alto saxophone, but, after moving to Stockholm in 1947, became a professional musician as a pianist. He planned on a classical career, studying privately with classical pianist Sven Brandel. Although he actually filled the baritone chair in Seymour Österwall’s band in 1949 by chance, it was enough for him to decide that it was an instrument with possibilities, influenced too by hearing the American baritone saxophonist Gerry Mulligan for the first time on the Birth of the Cool recordings. He worked as a member of Arne Domnérus’s septet (initially co-led by the trumpeter Rolf Ericson) for two years from 1951; the group mainly performed at Nalen, a leading dance spot in Stockholm.

At the same time, Gullin began to work with visiting American musicians, recording with James Moody, Zoot Sims and Clifford Brown. Most importantly, he first performed with Lee Konitz in 1951, an association which was to be repeated several times in future years.

Gullin formed his own group in 1953, probably the only regular group he was to lead. It was short-lived, breaking up that November, after Gullin was responsible for causing the group to be involved in an automobile accident, although no one was seriously hurt. The next year, 1954, he won the best newcomer award in the American DownBeat magazine, after two March 1953 Swedish sessions were leased and issued by Contemporary Records as a 10” LP. Later Gullin albums were leased to Atlantic Records in the United States. Gullin toured several European countries with Chet Baker in October 1955, in a group which was marred by tragedy; it was Gullin who found the body of the group's pianist Dick Twardzik, victim of a heroin overdose, on 21 October, in a Paris hotel room.

The remainder of Gullin’s career was blighted by his own narcotics problems, and sometimes he survived on artists' grants from the Swedish government. He was restricted by illness for much of the later part of 1958. During most of 1959, Gullin, was active in Italy, he played with Chet Baker again and with the jazz alto saxophonist (and businessman) Flavio Ambrosetti, making radio broadcasts with him in Lausanne, Switzerland.

In the 1960s, he continued to work occasionally with leading American players, including Archie Shepp, with whom he recorded in 1963. One of his last major statements was his Aeros aromatic atomica suite recorded in 1973.

Gullin died of a heart attack, brought on by his long-term addiction to methadone. A recording jointly led by Lee Konitz and pianist Lars Sjösten, Dedicated to Lee … Play the Music of Lars Gullin was recorded in 1983, and issued by Dragon Records, who have issued 11 CDs of Gullin's recordings. The film Sven Klang's Combo (Sven Klangs kvintett, 1976) is a fictionalised version of the Swedish jazz scene of the 1950s, and the saxophonist Lars is based on Gullin.

His son, Peter Gullin, (12 April 1959, Milan, Italy – 7 October 2003, Uppsala, Sweden) was also a baritone saxophonist and composer. The elder Gullin’s composition "Peter of April" was dedicated to him. The tune "Danny's Dream" was dedicated to his first son Danny Gullin and "Gabriella" to his daughter, Gabriella Gullin (born 1961), a composer and conductor.

Discography

As leader or co-leader
 1953 Piano Holiday (Metronome)
 1953 Modern Sounds (Contemporary)
 1954 Lars Gullin (Contemporary)
 1954 Danny's Dream (Dragon)
 1955 Gullin's Garden (EmArcy)
 1955 Lars Gullin (EmArcy)
 1955 Lars Gullin with the Moretone Singers (EmArcy)
 1955/56 Lars Gullin With Chet Baker (issued on Dragon Records in 1992)
 1956 Baritone Sax (WEA)
 1958 Swings (East-West)
 1958 Fine Together: The Artistry of Lars Gullin (Sonet)
 1963 The House I Live In (SteepleChase) – co-led with Archie Shepp
 1964 På Gyllene Cirkeln (At the Golden Circle, EMI, not issued until 1979)
 1971 Jazz Amour Affair (Odeon/Parlophone)
 1973 Like Grass (Odeon)
 1975 Lars Gullin Quintet Featuring Bernt Rosengren (Storyville)
 1976 Aeros Aromatica Atomica Suite (Odeon)
 2016 The Liquid Moves of Lars Gullin (Sonorama)

As sideman
With Arne Domnérus
 Arne Domnérus And His Orchestra 1950/1951 With Rolf Ericson Featuring Lars Gullin (Dragon, 2003)
With Rolf Ericson
 Rolf Ericson & The American Stars 1956 with Ernestine Anderson (Dragon, 1995)
With Stan Getz
 Imported from Europe (Verve, 1958)
With Bengt Hallberg
 All Star Sessions 1953/54 (Dragon, 2007)
With Quincy Jones
 Jazz Abroad (EmArcy, 1955)
With Nils Lindberg
 Sax Appeal (Barben, 1960) – originally issued as by The Swedish Modern Jazz Group, reissued as by Lindberg on Sax Appeal & Trisection (Dragon, 1992)

References

External links
 The Lars Gullin Society website
 Gullinmuseet (The Gullin Museum)

1928 births
1976 deaths
Cool jazz saxophonists
Jazz baritone saxophonists
People from Gotland
Swedish jazz saxophonists
Male saxophonists
20th-century saxophonists
20th-century Swedish male musicians
20th-century Swedish musicians
Male jazz musicians
Deaths from coronary artery disease